Timpanaro is an Italian surname. Notable people with the surname include:

Maximiliano Timpanaro (born 1988), Argentine footballer
Sebastiano Timpanaro (1923–2000), Italian classical philologist, essayist, and literary critic
Maria Timpanaro Cardini, classical philologist, mother of Sebastiano Timpanaro

Italian-language surnames